The XXVIII Golden Grand Prix Ivan Yarygin 2017, also known as Ivan Yarygin (Yariguin) 2017 was a wrestling event held in Krasnoyarsk, Russia between 27 and 29 January 2017.

This international tournament included competition in both Freestyle wrestling. This Grand Prix was held in honor of 2-time Olympic Champion Ivan Yarygin.

Kyle Snyder (Olympic champion), Cody Brewer and Nick Gwiazdowski (NCAA All-American), Gadzhimurad Rashidov (European champion), Rei Higuchi (Olympic silver medalist) and Sosuke Takatani (World 2014 runner-up) competed in this tournament.

Medal overview

Medal table

Men's freestyle

Women's freestyle

Participating nations
347 competitors from 15 nations participated.

 (1)
 (3)
 (3)
 (8)
 (2)
 (7) 
 (3)
 (17) 
 (27)
 (10) 
 (39)
 (1)
 (214)
 (7)
 (5)

References

External links 
 https://unitedworldwrestling.org/event/ivan-yariguin-2
 http://www.wrestrus.ru/news/fsbrnews/Novosti_sajta/match_boec_pokazhet_turnir_ivana_jarigina 

 
Golden Grand Prix Ivan Yarygin
Golden Grand Prix Ivan Yarygin
2017 in sport wrestling